Golden Gate Girl, also known as Tears in San Francisco or Jinmen Nü is a Hong Kong drama film made in San Francisco in 1941, directed by Esther Eng and veteran filmmaker Kwan Man Ching, the film was released in San Francisco but wasn't shown in Asia until 1946. The film is notable as it marked the film debut of Bruce Lee, just an infant at the time.

It tells of a widower (Moon Kwan) who is concerned that his daughter, Chain-ying (Tso Yee-man), spends too much time at the theater. When she falls in love with Wong, one of the company's leading actors, the enraged widower forces the theater to close its contract with Wong, resulting in the actor's deportation to China. But Chain-ying is already pregnant and dies after giving birth to a baby girl (played by Bruce Lee- then aged three months). The widower's former employees look after the baby, who, like her mother, grows up (Tso Yee-man again) with a passion for the theater. After a series of complications, tears, and comic moments, she is eventually reunited with her father, 
Wong, when he visits the United States to perform in a national defense play (to aid China then at war), and they are finally reconciled with her aging, remorseful maternal grandfather.

Stories about the making of Golden Gate Girl is reflected in a 2014 feature documentary titled Golden Gate Girls directed by S. Louisa Wei, who constructed the story around the life and time of woman film pioneer Esther Eng.

Cast
Nom Liu
Kwan Man Ching
Fee Luk Won
Wong Hok Sing
Man Tso Yee
Bruce Lee

References

1941 films
Cantonese-language films
Hong Kong black-and-white films
Films set in San Francisco
Films shot in San Francisco
Films about Cantonese opera